David Higgins ( 1823 – ?) was an African American preacher and state legislator in Mississippi between 1870 and 1872. He was a Republican.

Biography 

Higgins was born around 1823 in South Carolina and was African American. He worked as a preacher. In the 1880 census, he is recorded as being married to a woman named Maria and having sons.

He represented Oktibbeha County in the Mississippi House of Representatives from 1870 to 1872. He was elected alongside George H. Holland, both of them members of the Mississippi Republican Party. Higgins received 1,581 votes. In 1873, he represented Oktibbeha County at the state's Republican convention.

See also
African-American officeholders during and following the Reconstruction era

References

1823 births
African-American politicians during the Reconstruction Era
African-American state legislators in Mississippi
Members of the Mississippi House of Representatives
Year of death missing